Gérard de Sélys (29 March 1944 – 3 January 2020) was a Belgian journalist and writer. He began his career in 1970 as a freelance journalist and photographer in Belgium, focusing on social issues. He joined RTBF in 1973, where he worked as a journalist, radio show host, and web pioneer until 2004.

References

Belgian radio presenters
Belgian radio journalists
Male journalists
Mass media people from Brussels
Photographers from Brussels
1944 births
2020 deaths